A Man Called Adam may refer to:
 A Man Called Adam (group), a British electronic music group
 A Man Called Adam (film), a 1966 American drama musical film